Dzik has been the name of three ships of the Polish Navy:

 , a British U-class submarine transferred to the Polish Navy and serving between 1942 and 1946
 , a 
 , a 

Polish Navy ship names